Zina Ismail Suleiman Al Sadi (born 22 February 1994) is a Jordanian footballer who plays as a goalkeeper. She has been a member of the Jordan women's national team.

References

External links 
 

1994 births
Living people
People from Irbid
Jordanian women's footballers
Women's association football goalkeepers
Jordan women's international footballers
Footballers at the 2014 Asian Games
Asian Games competitors for Jordan
Jordan Women's Football League players